A Network-In-a-Box (NIB) is the combination of multiple components of a computer network into a single device (a 'box'), which are traditionally separated into multiple devices.

Examples 
 In 2021, the company Genie launched a 5G Network-In-a-Box to run as an on-premise service.
 In August 2021, Tecore Networks launched a 5G Network-In-a-Box, which also supported 3GGP and LTE.

History 
In 2014, an open-source hardware Network-In-a-Box based on OpenBTS was deployed in West-Papua, Indonesia.

References 

Computer networking